N'Dayi Kalenga may refer to:

N'Dayi Kalenga (footballer born 1967), Congolese midfielder who played for Ankaragücü and Altay S.K. in Turkey and Zaire national team
N'Dayi Kalenga (footballer born 1978), Congolese striker who last played for Msida St. Joseph F.C. in Malta, also played in Turkey